John Scott Harrison (October 4, 1804 – May 25, 1878) was an American farmer and politician who served as a member of the United States House of Representatives from Ohio. He was a son of U.S. president William Henry Harrison and First Lady Anna Harrison as well as the father of U.S. president Benjamin Harrison. He is the only person to have been both the son and father of U.S. presidents.

Early life and family 
Harrison was born in Vincennes, Indiana, to future President William Henry Harrison and Anna Tuthill Symmes. He was also a grandson of Declaration of Independence signer Benjamin Harrison V. Harrison completed preparatory studies and studied medicine. He later abandoned this to become a farmer.

In 1824, he married Lucretia Knapp Johnson (1804–1830). They had three children:
Elizabeth Short Harrison (1825–1904)
William Henry Harrison (1827–1829)
Sarah Lucretia Harrison (1829–1917)

On August 12, 1831, in Cincinnati, Ohio, he married Elizabeth Ramsey Irwin (1810–1850). He and Elizabeth had 10 children:

Lt Col Archibald Harrison (1832–1870); Commander, 27th Indiana Infantry Regiment
Benjamin Harrison (1833–1901); became president
Mary Jane Harrison (1835–1867)
Anna Symmes Harrison (1837–1838)
John Irwin Harrison (1839)
Carter Bassett Harrison (1840–1905); Captain, 51st Ohio Infantry Regiment
Anna Symmes Harrison (1842–1926)
John Scott Harrison Jr. (1844–1926)
James Findlay Harrison (1847–1848)
James Irwin Harrison (1849–1850)

After his father's death, in 1841, his mother moved in with his family to help raise the children.

Political career 
He was elected a Whig to the U.S. House of Representatives in 1852, reelected an Oppositionist in 1854 and served from 1853 to 1857. After being defeated for a third term in 1856, Harrison retired to his estate "Point Farm" in North Bend, Ohio where he died on May 25, 1878, aged 73. He was the last surviving child of William Henry Harrison. He was interred in the family tomb in North Bend, today the William Henry Harrison Tomb State Memorial, with his parents and other family members.  Harrison's body was stolen by grave robbers until it was eventually returned to its final place of rest.

Body snatching 
At that time it was common practice for graves to be robbed for recently deceased bodies for use in teaching dissection and anatomy at medical colleges.  As a result, many precautions were taken to secure Harrison's grave, including building a cemented brick vault, filling the grave with earth mixed with heavy stones, and employing a watchman to check the grave each hour of every night for a week.

The day of Harrison's funeral it was discovered that the body of Augustus Devin, which had been buried the previous week in an adjoining grave, had been stolen.  The following day, one of John Harrison's sons, together with a friend of Devin, traveled to Cincinnati to look for his body.  With search warrants in hand they went to the Ohio Medical College, where they discovered not Devin's body but the naked body of John Scott Harrison hanging from a rope in a chute.  Devin's body was later found preserved in a vat of brine at the medical college of the University of Michigan.

The outrage over the act, amid changing sensibilities regarding death, contributed materially to passage of the Ohio Anatomy Law of 1881, a landmark statute, whereby medical schools were provided with unclaimed bodies, which in turn discouraged grave robbers by removing their primary market.  As to the personal results, suits were brought against the Ohio Medical College; the Harrison estate was entered in a separate damage suit, in the amount of $10,000. The end result and decision in the three civil suits brought, has been lost in the passage of time, and no documentation is known to exist with this specific information.

References

External links

1804 births
1878 deaths
19th-century American politicians
American people of English descent
Children of presidents of the United States
Farmers from Ohio
Fathers of presidents of the United States
John Scott
Opposition Party members of the United States House of Representatives from Ohio
People from Hamilton County, Ohio
People from Vincennes, Indiana
Whig Party members of the United States House of Representatives from Ohio
Victims of body snatching